William Henry Sawtelle (August 27, 1868 – December 17, 1934) was a United States circuit judge of the United States Court of Appeals for the Ninth Circuit and previously was a United States district judge of the United States District Court for the District of Arizona.

Education and career

Born in Tuscumbia, Alabama, Sawtelle read law in 1886 and was in private practice of law in Tuscumbia from 1886 to 1903. He was a solicitor for the Alabama 8th Judicial Circuit from 1892 to 1898, and for the Alabama 11th Judicial Circuit from 1898 to 1903. He was in private practice in Tucson, Arizona Territory (State of Arizona from February 14, 1912) from 1903 to 1913.

Federal judicial service

Sawtelle was nominated by President Woodrow Wilson on August 6, 1913, to a seat on the United States District Court for the District of Arizona vacated by Judge Richard Elihu Sloan. He was confirmed by the United States Senate on August 18, 1913, and received his commission the same day. His service terminated on February 6, 1931, due to his elevation to the Ninth Circuit.

Sawtelle was nominated by President Herbert Hoover on January 8, 1931, to a seat on the United States Court of Appeals for the Ninth Circuit vacated by Judge Frank Sigel Dietrich. He was confirmed by the Senate on January 22, 1931, and received his commission on January 29, 1931. His service terminated on December 17, 1934, due to his death of a fall down the stairs at his home in San Francisco, California.

See also
Battle of Bear Valley

References

Sources
 

1868 births
1934 deaths
People from Tuscumbia, Alabama
Judges of the United States District Court for the District of Arizona
United States district court judges appointed by Woodrow Wilson
Judges of the United States Court of Appeals for the Ninth Circuit
United States court of appeals judges appointed by Herbert Hoover
20th-century American judges
United States federal judges admitted to the practice of law by reading law